DWIC (93.3 FM) was a radio station owned and operated by Bombo Radyo Philippines through its licensee Newsounds Broadcasting Network, Inc. It was formerly known as Star FM from its inception on June 29, 1992, to March 31, 2004, when it went off air due to financial losses. The frequency is currently owned by ACWS-United Broadcasting Network.

References

Radio stations in Cagayan
Radio stations established in 1992
Radio stations established in 2004
Defunct radio stations in the Philippines